Ada Cóncaro (1934 - 14 December 2010) was an Argentinian chef and gourmet of Italian heritage.

Cóncaro was born in Buenos Aires and studied chemistry at the University of Buenos Aires. She was a professor of mathematics in Patagonia before returning to Buenos Aires. In 1983 she founded the Tomo I restaurant in Buenos Aires, which became one of the most important gastronomic institutions in Argentina. She gave birth to three children, and left Tomo I to her son, Federico Fialayre. She died in Buenos Aires.

Citations

References

External links
 Ada Cóncaro, teacher and legend of Argentine cuisine
 Ada Cóncaro - Interview with Hugo Beccacece - La Nación
 

People from Buenos Aires
2010 deaths
1934 births
Argentine chefs
Women chefs
University of Buenos Aires alumni